Christmas with the Dickinsons is a reality television special aired by Oxygen Network. The show follows Janice Dickinson, her family and models from the first season of The Janice Dickinson Modeling Agency as they celebrate Christmas and appear in the Hollywood Christmas Parade. The one-hour special was aired on December 13, 2006.

The Twelve Days of Janice
Christmas with the Dickinsons featured the world premiere of Janice's music video, The Twelve Days of Janice (to the tune of The Twelve Days of Christmas). For her twelve days of Christmas, Janice's true love gave to her:
 Twelve boyfriends begging
 Eleven (criminal) charges pending
 Ten gays a-primping
 Nine models prancing
 Eight techs a-waxing
 Seven docs injecting (botox)
 Six paparazzi
 Five naked man
 Four Italian suits
 Three former husbands
 Two giant breasts
 And a fledgling modeling agency

The Janice Dickinson Modeling Agency
Christmas television specials